I Used to Go Here is a 2020 American comedy-drama film written and directed by Kris Rey. It stars Gillian Jacobs, Josh Wiggins, Hannah Marks, Forrest Goodluck, Jorma Taccone, Kate Micucci, Zoë Chao and Jemaine Clement. It stars Jacobs as novelist Kate Conklin who returns to her alma mater 15 years after graduating. It was released to video on demand platforms and select theatres on August 7, 2020, by Gravitas Ventures. It premiered on HBO Max in December 2020.

Plot
Writer Kate Conklin's engagement is called off at the same time the tour for her debut novel is cancelled due to poor sales. Shortly after, she receives an offer to speak at her alma mater, the fictitious Illinois University in Carbondale, Illinois (site of the real-life Southern Illinois University), from her former professor and mentor David Kirkpatrick.

Returning to Carbondale, Kate is surprised to be staying at a bed and breakfast across from the house she lived in while at university. She meets the current occupants, three boys named Hugo, Tall Brandon, and Animal, who allow her to visit her former room. She tells them she nicknamed the house The Writers' Retreat. They tell her the name is still used, which she finds flattering. They tell her she's welcome to come to the party they're having there that night.

After her reading, Kirkpatrick offers Kate a teaching position, which she mulls over. Walking home late and finding herself locked out of her B&B, she sees a number of students at the party across the street, and decides to join them. While there, she receives a text message from her former fiancé, asking her not to contact him anymore. Animal and his girlfriend end up comforting her, and they allow her to stay over at the house.

The next day, while consulting with writing students in a coffee shop, Kate meets with April, one of Kirkpatrick's students and Hugo's girlfriend. April is a rising star in the English department, and when Kate tries to give her some professional advice to make her writing more marketable, she is surprised to have her suggestions rejected.

Returning to her former residence, Kate learns that April has dumped Hugo. The others suspect that she was cheating with professor Kirkpatrick. Kate, Hugo, and two others decide to go to Kirkpatrick's house to try to verify the cheating rumors. They walk in on April and Kirkpatrick in bed together. After serving the students refreshments, Kirkpatrick tells Kate that he and his wife have an open relationship. Kate is disappointed by his actions, though, and further disappointed to learn that he has lied about reading her book. She declines the teaching position he offered her.

Kate and her student friends return to the house. When Kate tells Hugo she's been locked out of her B&B, he offers to let her stay in his room, her former room. He tells her he admires an essay she wrote when she was a student there, and the two make love. As Kate sneaks out of the house the following morning, she bumps into April, who is presumably arriving to see Hugo, and who deduces that Kate has just slept with him. Kate apologizes to her for not encouraging her work, and admits that her feelings of failure and jealousy prevented her from being more supportive.

On the drive back home, Kate's driver tells her he read and loved her book. When he asks her how the experience of being published has been for her, Kate says she thinks she "could have done better".

Cast
 Gillian Jacobs as Kate Conklin
 Jemaine Clement as David Kirkpatrick
 Hannah Marks as April Barnhardt
 Forrest Goodluck as Animal Springstine
 Josh Wiggins as Hugo Gaffney
 Kate Micucci as Rachel Gaffney
 Jorma Taccone as Bradley Cooper
 Zoë Chao as Laura
 Brandon Daley as Tall Brandon
 Khloe Janel as Emma
 Rammel Chan as Elliot
 Kristina Valada-Viars as Alexis

Production
In August 2019, it was announced Gillian Jacobs, Jemaine Clement, Hannah Marks, Forrest Goodluck, Josh Wiggins, Kate Micucci, Jorma Taccone, and Zoë Chao had joined the cast of the film, with Kris Rey directing from a screenplay she wrote.

Release
It was scheduled to have its world premiere at South by Southwest on March 14, 2020, however, the festival was cancelled due to the COVID-19 pandemic. Shortly after, Gravitas Ventures acquired distribution rights to the film and set it for an August 7, 2020 release.

Reception
The website's critics consensus reads: "Elevated significantly by Gillian Jacobs' central performance, I Used to Go Here tells a familiar story with considerable charm." On Metacritic, the film has a weighted average score of 68 out of 100, based on 18 critics, indicating "generally favorable reviews".

The A.V. Clubs Katie Rife gave the film a "B", noting Jacobs' performance and smart joke writing as key strengths, with some unevenness in tone that does not match all of Rey's strengths.

References

External links
 

Films postponed due to the COVID-19 pandemic
American comedy-drama films
2020 films
2020 independent films
2020 comedy-drama films
Films set in universities and colleges
Films about writers
2020s English-language films
2020s American films